Sphaeridium scarabaeoides is a species of water scavenger beetle in the family Hydrophilidae. It is found in Africa, Europe and Northern Asia (excluding China), North America, Oceania, and Southern Asia.

References

Further reading

External links

 

Hydrophilidae
Articles created by Qbugbot
Beetles described in 1758
Taxa named by Carl Linnaeus